Neurogenic differentiation factor 2 is a protein that in humans is encoded by the NEUROD2 gene.

Function 

This gene encodes a member of the neuroD family of neurogenic basic helix-loop-helix (bHLH) proteins. Expression of this gene can induce transcription from neuron-specific promoters, such as the GAP-43 promoter, which contain a specific DNA sequence known as an E-box. The product of the human gene can induce neurogenic differentiation in non-neuronal cells in Xenopus embryos, and is thought to play a role in the determination and maintenance of neuronal cell fates.

Interactions 

NEUROD2 has been shown to interact with Protein kinase N1.

References

Further reading

External links 
 

Transcription factors
Human proteins